Psammotis turkestanica is a moth in the family Crambidae. It was described by Eugene G. Munroe and Akira Mutuura in 1968. It is found in eastern Turkestan.

References

Pyraustinae
Moths described in 1968
Moths of Asia
Taxa named by Eugene G. Munroe
Taxa named by Akira Mutuura